Federico Quarenghi or Federigo Quarenghi (Milan, November 24, 1858 - Milan, 1940) was an Italian painter.

Biography
He studied at the Brera Academy under Giuseppe Bertini. His style was influenced by Tranquillo Cremona, and was mainly known for his elegant portraits. He exhibited commonly at the Brera, and among his paintings are portraits of Giacobbe Colombo and of the painter Attilio Pusterla.

References

1858 births
1940 deaths
19th-century Italian painters
Italian male painters
20th-century Italian painters
Painters from Milan
Brera Academy alumni
19th-century Italian male artists
20th-century Italian male artists